The Young is a peer reviewed academic journal that publishes research on the life situation of young people.

The journal is published four times a year by SAGE Publications, India with an aim to bring young people's experiences to the centre of analysis with a view to strengthening youth research.

This journal is a member of the Committee on Publication Ethics (COPE).

Abstracting and indexing 
Young is abstracted and indexed in:
 ProQuest: International Bibliography of the Social Sciences (IBSS)
 Social Sciences Citation Index (Web of Science)
 SCOPUS
 DeepDyve
 Portico
 Dutch-KB
 Pro-Quest-RSP
 EBSCO
 Sociological Abstracts - ProQuest
 J-Gate

References 

 http://publicationethics.org/members/young

External links 
 

SAGE Publishing academic journals
Publications established in 2007
Sociology journals